Leslie Miscampbell Frost  (September 20, 1895 – May 4, 1973) was a politician in Ontario, Canada, who served as the province's 16th premier from May 4, 1949, to November 8, 1961. Due to his lengthy tenure, he gained the nickname "Old Man Ontario"; he was also known as "the Silver Fox".

Early years

Born in Orillia, Ontario, he was the son of William Sword Frost and Margaret Jane Barker. His father was a jeweller and mayor of Orillia; his mother was an important figure in the early days of The Salvation Army. He attended the University of Toronto and Osgoode Hall Law School.  During World War I, he was an officer with "C"Company 157th Battalion (Simcoe Foresters), CEF, and served with the 20th Battalion, Queen's York Rangers in France and Belgium. In 1918, after being wounded, he was discharged with the rank of Captain. He was called to the Bar in 1921.

In 1926, he married Gertrude Jane Carew. They had no children. The couple lived in Lindsay, Ontario, but Frost preferred his property at Pleasant Point on Sturgeon Lake north of Lindsay. When Frost and his brother, Cecil Gray Frost, first moved to Lindsay to establish a law practice, they rented a building at Pleasant Point that had been the community store and commuted to town by steamer. Frost bought the property in 1925 and, in about 1950, bought adjacent property where he built the winterized log cabin that was his refuge while he was premier and in retirement.

Early political career
In 1937, he was first elected to the Ontario legislature and thereafter never lost an election. He was the Treasurer of Ontario and Minister of Mines from 1943 to 1955.
Frost was chosen as leader of the Ontario Progressive Conservative Party (the "Tories") following Premier George Drew's decision to enter federal politics.

Premier of Ontario

Dubbed "The Old Man Ontario" and "The Laird of Lindsay", Frost led the province during the economic boom of the 1950s.  His low-key approach garnered him the nickname "The Great Tranquilizer".  Combining small-town values with progressive policies, he took the Tories through three successive electoral victories winning majority governments in 1951, 1955 and 1959.

Economic policy

Frost's government also attempted to wrest control of the income tax from the federal government, but failed, resulting in the introduction of a provincial sales tax. The Frost government introduced public hospital insurance to the province; it would be expanded by his successors to become the modern OHIP system of Medicare.

Frost's government oversaw substantial expansion in public services and substantially increased public investment in the economy, as well as through strong fiscal policies.

Education policy

Under Frost, the number of universities in Ontario increased from four to twelve. As finance minister in 1943, the total provincial investment in education was just over $13 million.  Upon his retirement in 1961, the education budget for Ontario was $250 million.

Social policy

The Frost government was the first to pass laws providing penalties for racial, ethnic, and gender discrimination on private property; these laws, introduced in the early 1950s as the Fair Employment Practices Act and Fair Accommodation Practices Act, started a movement in Ontario politics that produced the Ontario Human Rights Code in 1962 and later legislation. Frost's government also introduced legislation to ensure women received equal wages. His government also introduced voting rights for First Nations.

Frost's government oversaw great expansion in the role of government. Under his leadership, Ontario greatly expanded its schools, highways and hospitals. Under his leadership Ontario created the 400 series of superhighways, most notably the Macdonald-Cartier Freeway better known as Highway 401.

Frost's government oversaw the federation of the old City of Toronto with twelve surrounding municipalities to become Metropolitan Toronto.

Retirement

Frost resigned in 1961, and was succeeded as Tory leader and Premier by John Robarts.

After politics
Upon retirement from politics, Frost served on the Board of Governors of the University of Toronto. As well, he was a member of the Board of Directors of the Bank of Montreal, KVP, Canada Life, and Trans Canada Air. Between 1954 and 1969 he also served as Vice-President of the Champlain Society and as its Honorary Vice-President from 1969 to 1973. He served as Chancellor of Trent University from 1967 to 1973. In retirement, he continued his interest in the outdoors. Near the end of his life, he undertook for the government of Ontario an exhaustive investigation of the state and potential of Algonquin Provincial Park. In the last interview he gave, just before he died, to the Toronto Star, he declared: "I am an environmentalist."

Frost was an excellent amateur historian. His book Fighting Men covered the history of the 35th Regiment of Simcoe Foresters from Orillia, Ontario in the context of the First World War. Within that he connects the Canadian home front to the war front in France, and connects the events within the regiment to the bigger picture of the war and Canada's subsequent role in world affairs.  His Forgotten Pathways of the Trent (published just after he died) challenged historians' previous conclusions about Indian trade and warfare routes in southern Ontario. He was an avid U.S. Civil War buff and kept on the mantelpiece in his large library a piece of wood that was supposed to have come from Abraham Lincoln's original log cabin.

Honours

In 1969, he was made a Companion of the Order of Canada, Canada's highest civilian honour.

Various places across Ontario are named for Frost:

 Frost Building, Toronto - houses the Ontario Ministry of Finance and the Ontario Management Board Secretariat, at Queen's Park, was named in his honour.
 Frost Centre for Canadian Studies and Indigenous Studies, Peterborough, Ontario - at Trent University, 
 Leslie Frost Library at Glendon College (York University), Toronto
 Frost Campus at Fleming College, Lindsay, Ontario 
 Leslie Frost Public School, Lindsay, Ontario - a school
 Leslie Frost Place - a street in Lindsay, Ontario
 Frost Centre Institute - formerly the Leslie M. Frost Natural Resource Centre, operated a private educational facility in Haliburton County offering secondary school credits.
 Portrait of Frost resides at Trent University

Selected bibliography
 Pleasant Point Story: a History of Pleasant Point (1965)
 Fighting Men, with a foreword by Thomas H.B. Symons (1967)
 Forgotten Pathways of the Trent (1973)
 The record on Sir Sam Hughes set straight

References

Further reading

External links
 
 
 Leslie M. Frost fonds , Archives of Ontario
 

1895 births
1973 deaths
Lawyers in Ontario
Canadian King's Counsel
Canadian Expeditionary Force officers
University of Toronto alumni
Chancellors of Trent University
Companions of the Order of Canada
Finance ministers of Ontario
Leaders of the Progressive Conservative Party of Ontario
Members of the King's Privy Council for Canada
Members of the United Church of Canada
Premiers of Ontario
People from Orillia
Osgoode Hall Law School alumni